Mirza Raja Man Singh I (21 December 1550 – 6 July 1614) was the 29th Kachwaha Rajput Raja of Amer, later known as Jaipur state, in Rajputana. He was the most powerful and trusted general of the Mughal emperor Akbar, who included him among the Navaratnas, or the nine (nava) gems (ratna) of the royal court of Akbar. Man Singh fought sixty-seven important battles in Kabul, Balkh, Bukhara, Bengal and Central and Southern India. He was well versed in the battle tactics of both the Rajputs as well as the Mughals.

Early life of Man Singh I

He was the son of Raja Bhagwant Das and his wife Bhagawati of Amer. He was born on Sunday, 21 December 1550.  

Initially known as Kunwar (prince), Man Singh received the title of Mirza or Raja (King) and the rank mansab of 5000 after the death of his father on 10 December 1589 from Akbar. On 26 August 1605, Man Singh became a mansabdar of 7,000, i.e., a commander of 7,000 cavalry in the Mughal forces, which was the maximum command for anyone other than a son of the Mughal emperor and the guardian of Khusrau, the eldest son Jahangir. Akbar called him Farzand (son). He fought many important campaigns for Akbar. Kunwar Man Singh led the Mughal Army in the well-known battle of Haldighati fought in 1576 against the Kingdom of Mewar and for his reestablishment of Jagannath Temple of Puri, Orissa.

War against Mewar

Man Singh was sent by Akbar to Maharana Pratap to make a treaty with Akbar and accept Mughal sovereignty. However Pratap, as a grandson of Rana Sanga, wanted to drive out Mughals as foreign invaders from Indian soil; he refused to accept Akbar's sovereignty and called Akbar  'a lowly Turk'''.

Man Singh was appointed by Akbar to lead the Mughal Army against the kingdom of Mewar. Man Singh started from Ajmer on 3 April 1576.

In the Battle of Haldighati, Pratap had 3,000 horsemen, some elephants and 400 Bhil archers under Rana Poonja. A small artillery unit was also with him under Hakim Khan Sur. The force was divided into five wings. The advance wing was under Hakim Khan Sur, Bhim Singh Dodiya and Ramdas Rathore. The right wing was under Bhamashah and Maharaja Ramshah Tanwar. The left wing was under Jhala Man Singh. Rana Pratap was in the centre. Behind him was Rao Poonja with his Bhil warriors.

Man Sing's Forces Consisted of 10,000 horsemen, infantry and some elephants. This included 4,000 Kachwaha Rajput forces. and 5,00 Mughal forces, out of which, 1,000 were other Hindu reserves, and 5,000 were Muslims.

This force was divided into five wings. There were two advance wings. The first was under Sayyid Hashim Barha, son of Sayyed Mahmud Khan, Jagannath Kachwaha and Asaf Ali Khan. The second advance troop was under Madho Singh Kachwaha. Behind this was Man Singh. To his right was Mulla Qazi Khan and to his left were Sayyeds of Barah. At first Rana Pratap attacked and scattered the advance and left wings of the Mughal army but soon momentum shifted with Mansingh's counter charge forced Pratap to retreat back. Jagannath Kachwaha killed Ramshah Tanwar and Rajput warriors of both sides engaged in a fierce battle. The Mughals were the victors and inflicted significant casualties among the Mewaris but failed to capture Pratap, who escaped to the hills. 

Expedition to Kabul
In 1580 CE, some prominent Muslim officers of Akbar, displeased with his liberal religious policies, started to conspire against him. Qazi Muhammad Yazdi declared it the duty of every Muslim to rebel against Akbar. In Bihar and Bengal they declared Mirza Hakim, Akbar's stepbrother and Governor of Kabul, to be the emperor. Akbar sent armies to Bihar and Bengal to crush this rebellion, while he himself started towards Kabul; Man Singh with him. On 8 March 1581, Akbar reached Machhiwara and soon arrived on the banks of River Indus, he then sent an advance force led by Man Singh to Kabul. Although, Akbar's army was hesitating to cross the swelling Indus River, Man Singh was able to cross it first followed by troops. Hearing the news Mirza Hakim fled to Gurband. Following the army, Akbar himself arrived at Kabul on 10 August 1581. Hakim was pardoned by Akbar, but his sister Bakhtunissa Begum was appointed Governor of Kabul. After Akbar returned to Fatehpur Sikri; Bakhtunissa remained as the nominal head of state, while Hakim acted as the governor (Hakim died in July, 1582). Kabul was annexed by the Mughal Empire and Man Singh was appointed governor. He remained in Kabul for some years and built a fortress, used by succeeding Mughal governors. Man Singh brought many talented men with him when he returned from Kabul. Some of their descendants still live in Jaipur.

Again in 1585 CE, some Afghan tribes rose against the Mughal empire. The Yusufzai and "Mandar" tribes were the main ones among them. Akbar sent an army under Zain Khan, Hakim Abul Fateh and Raja Birbal to control these revolting tribes. However,  they failed to control the revolting Afghans and Raja Birbal, friend of Akbar and one of his Navratnas was also killed in the battle with Afghans. Akbar then sent Raja Todar Mal to crush the revolt and called Raja Man Singh to help Todar Mal. Todarmal had some success in controlling  the rebellious Afghan tribes, but the real source of the revolt was behind the Khyber Pass. It was hard to cross this pass which was dominated by Afghan "Kabailies". Man Singh was accompanied by "Rao Gopaldas" of Nindar in this expedition, who bravely made way for Mughal army in the pass. After crossing the pass Man Singh decisively defeated five major tribes of Afghans including Yusufzai and "Mandar" tribes. The flag of Amber was changed from "Katchanar" (green climber in white base) to "Pachranga" (five colored) to commemorate this victory. This flag continued in use until accession of Jaipur state in India. This permanently crushed the revolt and the area remained peaceful thereafter.

In 1586 CE, Akbar sent another army under Raja Bhagwant Das, father of Kunwar Man Singh to win Kashmir. Kashmir was captured and annexed in the Mughal Empire and made a Sarkar (district) of Kabul province. Man Singh and his father Raja Bhagwant Das are reputed to have brought the technology of cannon production to Amber.

Conquest of Bihar

When Akbar had conquered Delhi, many of his Afghan enemies had fled to the refuge of the eastern Raja's. Man Singh was sent by Emperor Akbar to bring the resisting Raja's to submission. Man Singh's first target was Raja Puranmal of Gidhaur whose fort was easily conquered by the Kachwaha army. Puranmals treasury was captured and his daughter was married to Man Singh's brother Chandrabhan Kachwaha. Man Singh continued his campaign and defeated the raja's of Gaya and Kargpur, both of them were forced into submission and paid tribute to the emperor. Some Afghan nobles of Bengal tried to invade Bihar during Man Singh's occupation, but were soundly defeated by Man Singh's son Jagat Singh. The invaders left their loot and fled back to Bengal, the spoils of war and 54 elephants were sent to the emperor. Abul Fazl has described Man Singh's campaign in Bihar in the following words. "The Raja united ability with courage and genius with strenuous action".Rajasthan Through the Ages Vol III, By R.K. Gupta, S.R. Bakshi pg.3-4

Conquest of Orissa

After conquering Bihar, Man Singh was ordered to defeat the Afghan Sultan Qatlu Khan Lohani of Orissa. Man Singh set out for Orissa in April 1590. Jagat Singh Kachwaha was sent with an advance army to study the area, however he was attacked by Sultan Qatlu Khan and was badly defeated where several notable commanders of Amber were killed, including Bika Rathor, Mahesh Das and Naru Charan. Jagat was saved by  Raja Hamir Singh and escaped to the fort of Bishnupur. Qatlu however died after 10 days and the Afghans under his son Nasir Khan surrendered to Man Singh. Nasir bowed before Man Singh and promised to read the Khutba and stamp coins in the name of emperor Akbar. He further ceded lands and gave a tribute of 150 elephants. After this success, Man Singh returned to Bihar. The Afghans however rebelled against Nasir after his regent Isa Khan died. The Afghans captured the lands that had been ceded and started another rebellion. Man Singh was once again forced to march to Orissa. On 9 April 1592, the two armies met near Jaleswar city and after a bloody fight Man Singh defeated the Afghans, Man singh followed the fleeing Afghans and forced the Afghan leaders to accept Mughal overlordship. The remaining Afghan chieftains fled to the Hindu Raja's of Orissa. Man Singh attacked these Raja's and captured several forts with ease and forced them to surrender, the strongest of these Raja's, the Raja of Khurda however refused and was pressed by Man Singh, several of his cities and forts were captured after which the Khurda Raja shut himself in his capital fort. Akbar denounced this rough behaviour towards such an ancient dynasty and ordered Man singh to show leniency after which the Khurda Raja surrendered and offered his daughter to Man Singh in marriage. The conquest of Orissa was thus complete. Man Singh was called to Lahore where the crown prince Salim personally received him and he was given robes of condolence by the emperor for his father's death. Man Singh presented to the emperor three sons of Quatlu Khan Lohani and 2 nobles of Orissa.

Governor of Bengal, Bihar, Jharkhand and Odisha
On 17 March 1594, Raja Man Singh was appointed Subahdar (Governor) of Bengal, Bihar, Jharkhand and Odisha. He made his headquarters in Rohtas, in Bihar. In doing so, he renovated the fortifications and also built a Haveli (Palatial House) in Rohtasgarh Fort, which still stands to this date. On 9 November 1595 Man Singh laid the foundations of a new capital of Bengal Subah at Rajmahal, Jharkhand and named it Akbarnagar, after Akbar, the emperor. It appears to have been chosen as the site of the capital on account of its central position with reference to Bengal and Bihar and for its command of both the river Ganges and the pass of Teliagarhi. Man Singh built a palace, a fort, and also a Jama-i-Masjid (known as Hadafe Mosque) at Rajmahal. During his tenure as governor, Man Singh further expanded the Mughal Empire by defeating and subduing the old kingdoms of Bengal, Bihar and Odisha. He defeated Maharaja Pratap Aditya of Jessore, and brought the famous idol of "Shila Devi" to Amber. The temple of this goddess is still present in Amber fort. During Navratris lakhs of people gather here. Raja Man Singh served three successive terms as governor of this area, in 1594–98, 1601–1605, 1605–1606.

Jahangir and twilight of Man Singh I
Prince Salim was born, but he became addicted to alcohol and opium in his youth. He disobeyed royal orders and became infamous for torture such as murdering Abul Fazal. Akbar tried hard to reform him as well as his eldest son Khusrau Mirza. Two of Akbar's sons, Murad and Danial, died in his lifetime. The royal court was divided into two factions, one favoring Khusrau and the other Salim to be the next emperor. Raja Man Singh and Mirza Aziz Koka were in Khusrau's favour. In 1605, when Akbar fell ill, he appointed Salim to be his heir. Though Man Singh opposed Salim's accession to the throne during Akbar's lifetime, he never opposed Jahangir (Salim) after his coronation. After Akbar's death, Jahangir (Salim) became emperor. Man Singh was initially sent as Subahdar of Bengal on 10 November 1605 for a short period, but soon he was replaced by Qutb-ud-Din Khan Koka on 2 September 1606. Jahangir also ordered removal of some of the modifications which had been made by Raja Man Singh to his palace at Amber. But in 1611 CE, the southern provinces of Ahmednagar, Berar and Khandesh defied Mughal sovereignty under Malik Ambar. Jahangir sent Raja Man Singh and others to crush the revolt.

Death and succession

Man Singh died a natural death on 6 July 1614 at Ellichpur. Following his death, he was succeeded by his son Mirza Raja Bhau Singh. His direct descendants became known (to this date) as the Rajawats who had the privilege to the throne of Amber and subsequently Jaipur.

Cultural achievements
Raja Man Singh was a devotee of Shri Krishna and a great ruler who come to Mughal side for a reason to first make them friends and later serve to his own people and culture. He had a seven-storied temple of Krishna constructed for Srila Rupa Goswami, disciple of Sri Caitanya Mahaprabhu, in Vrindavan. The cost of construction was one crore rupees at that time. The four-storey temple is still present at Vrindavan. He also constructed a temple of Krishna at his capital, Amber. The place is now known as "Kanak Vrindavan" near Amber Ghati of Jaipur. He constructed the temple of Shila Devi at Amber Fort. He also constructed and repaired many temples at Benaras, Allahabad and various other places. He added much beautification to his palace at Amber. When Akbar called a meeting of his nobles at Fatehpur Sikri in 1582, to discuss Din-i-Ilahi, Raja Bhagwant Das was the only man to oppose this religion. Later, Man Singh also refused to convert to Din-i-Ilahi. It is believed his son Jagat Singh I received education from Goswami Tulsidas and Man Singh himself used to attend his religious lectures. Tulsidas was a contemporary of Akbar and author of Ramcharit Manas, known as Tulsi Ramayana, and much other famous poetry devoted to Rama and Hanuman.

In popular culture
 2013–2015: Jodha Akbar, broadcast on Zee TV, where he was played by Ankit Raizada.
 2013–2015: Bharat Ka Veer Putra – Maharana Pratap, broadcast by Sony Entertainment Television (India), where he was portrayed by Kanha Shashikant Sharma.
 1988-1989 : Bharat Ek Khoj, broadcast on  Doordarshan, where he was played by Surendra Pal.

See also
House of Kachwaha
List of Rajputs
Pratap Singh, Maharana of Mewar
Origin of Rajputs
Dara Shikoh

Notes

References
 Beveridge, H. (tr.) (1939, reprint 2000). The Akbarnama of Abu´l Fazl, Vol. III, Kolkata: The Asiatic Society, .

 
 Raja Man Singh of Amber by Rajiva Nain Prasad. Calcutta, World Press Private Ltd., 1966.
 
 Sarkar, Jadunath (1984, reprint 1994). A History of Jaipur, New Delhi: Orient Longman .
 Sagar, Nanuram Kavita Kalptaru''.

External links
Akbarnama by Abul Fazal Part III chapter 31,32,34
 Version of Mewar
 Genealogy of Kachwaha kings

Mughal generals
1550 births
1614 deaths
Maharajas of Jaipur
Subahdars of Bengal
Subahdars of Bihar
Subahdars of Odisha
History of Bangladesh
Hindu monarchs
Indian monarchs
Indian Hindus